Eye of the Hunter is the debut solo album by Brendan Perry, previously the male half of the band Dead Can Dance. The album was released by 4AD on 4 October 1999 in the UK and a day later in the US.

Overview
The album's title is found in the lyrics of the album's first single "Voyage of Bran", wherein a character called Brendan says: "I live by the river where the old gods still dream of inner communion with the open sea / Through the eye of a hunter in search of a prey, neither beast nor human in my philosophy."

The song "Sloth" first appeared during concerts with Dead Can Dance and appears on the band's 2001 box set Dead Can Dance (1981–1998). "I Must Have Been Blind" is a cover of a Tim Buckley song, from his 1970 album Blue Afternoon. Perry later covered another song by Buckley, "Dream Letter," which was released the following year on the tribute album Sing a Song for You.

Reception

Critical reception to the album was generally positive.

Track listing

Note: The title "Voyage of Bran" refers to Irish story The Voyage of Bran, and "Medusa" to the mythological Medusa.

Personnel
Musical
Brendan Perry – vocals, 12-string guitar, electric guitar, mandolin, keyboards
with
Glen Garrett – electric bass guitar, upright bass guitar
Liam Bradley – drums
Martin Quinn – pedal steel guitar
Michael Brunnock – backing vocals on "Saturday's Child"

Technical
Mastered by Walter Coelho at Masterpiece

Graphical
Art direction by Brendan Perry
Design by Chris Bigg
Back cover photograph by Dennis Di Cicco
Textures by v23 (Vaughan Oliver)

References

External links
 Eye of the Hunter at 4AD: with audio samples
 : with links to artists works
 Eye of the Hunter at Dead-can-dance.com: with a Perry quote
 Eye of the Hunter lyrics (official) at DCD Within: with some typos
 Eye of the Hunter lyrics (fansite) at Dead-can-dance.com

1999 debut albums
4AD albums
Brendan Perry albums